Metaphysics is the branch of philosophy that investigates principles of reality transcending those of any particular science. Cosmology and ontology are traditional branches of metaphysics. It is concerned with explaining the fundamental nature of being and the world. Someone who studies metaphysics can be called either a "metaphysician" or a "metaphysicist".

A 
Absolute idealism --
Absolute time and space --
Abstract object --
Absurdism --
Accident (philosophy) --
Accidentalism (philosophy) --
Action theory (philosophy)
Actualism --
Adolph Stöhr --
Alfred North Whitehead
Alvin Plantinga --
Ananda Coomaraswamy --
Anti-realism --
Apologism --
Arda Denkel --
Aristotelianism --
Aristotle --
Arthur Schopenhauer --
Axiology

B 
Baruch Spinoza --
Being --
Bertrand Russell --
Bertrand Russell's views on philosophy --
Body hopping --
Borussian myth --
Brian Leftow --
Bundle theory --

C 
C. D. Broad --
Carlo Michelstaedter --
Categories of the understanding --
Category of being --
Causality --
Charles François d'Abra de Raconis --
Choice --
Church of Divine Science --
Clinamen --
Cogito ergo sum
Compatibilism and incompatibilism --
Conatus --
Concept --
Conceptualism --
Concluding Unscientific Postscript to Philosophical Fragments --
Container space --
Counterpart theory --
Creative visualization --

D 
Damon Young --
David Kellogg Lewis --
David Kolb --
David Wiggins --
Dean Zimmerman (philosopher) --
Dermot Moran --
Determinism --
Dickinson S. Miller --
Disquisitions relating to Matter and Spirit --
Doctrine of internal relations --
Donald Davidson (philosopher) --
Dorothy Emmet --
Downward causation --
Dualistic cosmology --
Duns Scotus --
Duration (Bergson) --
Dynamism (metaphysics) --
Dysteleology --

E 
Edward N. Zalta --
Elbow Room (Dennett book) --
Eleatics --
Embodied cognition --
Emergence --
Endurantism --
Entity --
Essence --
Essentialism --
Eternalism (philosophy of time) --
Eternity of the world --
Event (philosophy) --
Evil demon --
Exemplification theory --
Existence --
Existentialism --
Experience --
Extension (metaphysics) --

F 
Face-to-face --
Ferdinando Cazzamalli --
Form --
Formal distinction --
Fragmentalism --
Frankfurt counterexamples --
Free will --
Free will in antiquity --
Frithjof Schuon --

G 
Georg Wilhelm Friedrich Hegel --
George Berkeley --
G. E. Moore --
Gerardus Everardus Tros --
Gilbert Simondon --
Gottfried Leibniz --
Graham Priest --
Growing block universe --
Gunk (mereology) --

H 
Hilary Putnam --
Hindu idealism --
Human spirit --
Humanistic naturalism --
Huna (New Thought) --
Hylomorphism --
Hylozoism --

I 
Ian Rumfitt --
Idea --
Idealism --
Identity and change --
Identity (philosophy) --
Identityism --
Immanence --
Immanuel Kant --
Impenetrability --
Indefinite monism --
Indeterminism --
Information --
Inherence --
Intention --
Introduction to Metaphysics (Bergson) --
Intuition (Bergson) --
Involution (philosophy) --
Irrealism (philosophy) --

J 
Jay Rosenberg --
Jean-Paul Sartre --
Jewish Science --
John Hawthorne --
John Locke --
Joseph Murphy (author) --
Judith Jarvis Thomson --

K 
Kit Fine --

L 
Law of attraction (New Thought) --
Letters to a Philosophical Unbeliever --
Libertarianism (metaphysics) --
List of metaphysicians --
Logical atomism --
Logical holism --
Ludwig Wittgenstein

M 
Mahmoud Khatami --
Marcus Fronius --
Martin Heidegger
Mary Ellen Tracy --
Material monism --
Material substratum --
Materialism --
Matter (philosophy) --
Meaning (existential) --
Meaning of life --
Mechanism (philosophy) --
Meditations on First Philosophy --
Meliorism --
Melissus of Samos --
Mental representation --
Meta-ontology --
Metametaphysics --
Metaphysical naturalism --
Metaphysical nihilism --
Metaphysical Society --
Metaphysical Society of America --
Metaphysics --
Michael Devitt --
Mind --
Mind-body dualism --
Monism --
Morris Lichtenstein --
Motion (physics)

N 
Nathan Salmon --
Natural law --
Naturalism (philosophy) --
Necessary and sufficient condition --
New Age --
New Thought --
Nihilism
Nominalism --
Non-essentialism --
Noneism --
Notion (philosophy) --
Noumenon --

O 
Object --
Objective idealism --
Objectivism --
Ontological pluralism --
Ontology --
Open individualism
Organicism --
Other --

P 
P. F. Strawson --
Parmenides --
Participation (philosophy) --
Particular --
Pattern --
Paul Benacerraf --
Paul Weiss (philosopher) --
Perception --
Perdurantism --
Personal identity --
Peter Glassen --
Peter Unger --
Peter van Inwagen --
Peter Wessel Zapffe --
Phenomenalism --
Philosophical realism --
Philosophical theology --
Philosophy --
Philosophy of mind --
Philosophy of Organism --
Philosophy of space and time --
Philosophy of Spinoza --
Physical body --
Physicalism --
Physis --
Pirsig's metaphysics of Quality --
Plato --
(Plato) The cave --
(Plato) The divided line --
(Plato) The Sun --
Platonic idealism --
Platonic realism --
Plotinus --
Pluralism (philosophy) --
Practical Metaphysics --
Predeterminism --
Primary/secondary quality distinction --
Principle --
Principle of individuation --
Projectivism --
Property (philosophy) --
Psychonautics --

Q 
Qualia --
Quality (philosophy) --
Quantity --
Quiddity --
Quietism --

R 
Rational mysticism --
Reality --
Reductionism --
Reflexive monism --
Relational space --
Relativism --
Religious Science --
René Descartes --
Rhonda Byrne --
Robert Merrihew Adams --
Robert Stalnaker --

S 
Saul Kripke --
Scientific realism --
Self (philosophy) --
Shadworth Hodgson --
Simple (philosophy) --
Simulacra and Simulation --
Simulated reality --
Simulation hypothesis --
Simulism --
Solipsism --
Soul --
Space --
Species (metaphysics) --
Speculative realism --
Stoic categories --
Stuart Wilde --
Subject --
Subject (philosophy) --
Subjectivism --
Substance --
Substance theory --
Sufi metaphysics --
Supervenience --

T 
Teaism --
Teleology --
Temporal finitism --
Temporal parts --
Terence Parsons --
The Doctrine of Philosophical Necessity Illustrated --
The Philosophical Library --
The Realms of Being --
Theoretical physics --
Theory of everything (philosophy) --
Theory of Forms --
Theosophy --
Thomas Aquinas --
Thought --
Time --
Transcendental idealism --
Transcendental perspectivism --
Trenton Merricks --
Truth --
Truth-value link --
Tychism --
Type (metaphysics) --

U 
Unity Church --
Universal (metaphysics) --
Universal mind --
Universal reason --
Universality (philosophy) --
Unobservable --

V 
Value (ethics) --
Voluntarism (metaphysics) --

W 
Wallace Wattles --
Will (philosophy) --
Will to live --
Willard Van Orman Quine --
William Alston --
William Desmond (philosopher) --
William Lycan --
Wolfgang Smith --
World Hypotheses --
World

Z 
Zeno of Elea

References 

Metaphysics